The Lalla Abla Mosque, also known as Port Mosque, is an iconic mosque in Tangier, Morocco, completed in 2017 and dedicated by King Mohammed VI in July 2018. It replaced a smaller mosque on a nearby location, also known as the Port Mosque.

It is named after Mohammed VI's grandmother Lalla Abla bint Tahar, echoing the dedication 35 years earlier of Tangier's Mohammed V Mosque to Lalla Abla's husband and Mohammed VI's grandfather. 

The mosque occupies a 5,712 square meters land lot, in a prominent location on Tangier's fishing port that was inaugurated by Mohammed VI a few weeks earlier in June 2018. It can host over 1,900 worshippers, in two separate prayer halls for men and women.

See also
 Mohammed V Mosque, Tangier
 Mausoleum of Mohammed V
 List of mosques in Morocco

Notes

Mosques in Tangier
Tourist attractions in Tangier